Bernardo Sayão is a municipality located in the Brazilian state of Tocantins. Its population was 4,448 (2020) and its area is 927 km².

References

Municipalities in Tocantins